Pakenham and Troston Ward is one of a number of West Suffolk District Council wards created to come into force following the 2019 local elections held on 2 May 2019. This was part of the 2019–2023 structural changes to local government in England.

References

West Suffolk District